Metzneria riadella is a moth of the family Gelechiidae. It was described by Englert in 1974. It is found in Spain and on Crete and Cyprus.

References

Moths described in 1974
Metzneria